Makdin-e Olya (also Romanized as Makdīn-e ‘Olyā and Makedīn Olyā; also known as Makdīn-e Bālā and Makeh Dīn ‘Olyā) is a village in Pishkuh-e Mugui Rural District, in the Central District of Fereydunshahr County, Isfahan Province, Iran. At the 2006 census, its population was 149, in 32 families.

References 

Populated places in Fereydunshahr County